Geeveston is a small  town in the south of Tasmania in Australia on the Huon River,  south west of Hobart, making it Australia's most southerly administrative centre. The town takes its name from William Geeves, an English settler who was given a land grant by Lady Jane Franklin in the area then known as Lightwood Bottom (after a type of timber prevalent in the area). The settlement Geeves set up was renamed Geeves Town in 1861, and the name eventually became Geeveston. Geeveston is for local government purposes included in the area of the Huon Valley Council and is part of the division of Franklin for both Australian House of Representatives and Tasmanian House of Assembly electoral purposes.

Geeveston is on the Huon Highway, and is the gateway to the Hartz Mountains National Park. It is the centre of Tasmania's apple and fruit-growing industry, and has also been highly reliant on the timber industry since the late 19th century. A pulp mill was opened in the town in 1962, and was Geeveston's largest employer until the plant closed in 1982, devastating the area economically. The Forest & Heritage Centre, a tourist centre which details the history of the timber industry in the area, is located in Geeveston. From 2016-2021, the town hosted the filming of the comedy series Rosehaven.

History
Geeves-Town Post Office opened on 1 June 1876 and was renamed Geeveston in 1888.

Climate
Typically for southeastern Tasmania, Geeveston has a pleasant oceanic climate (Köppen Cfb) with typically warm summers and cool winters. Occasionally, very hot air from Central Australia will be driven across the region by anticyclones lying over the Tasman Sea, producing hot to sweltering conditions and extremely dangerous bushfire conditions.

See also
Tahune Airwalk

References

External links

Geeveston Cenotaph - Monument Australia (www.monumentaustralia.org.au)
Geeveston Central - directory of businesses in the local area

Localities of Huon Valley Council
Southern Tasmania
1842 establishments in Australia